Erling Tambs (May 25, 1888 - 1967) was a Norwegian writer and sailor.

Life 
Erling Tambs was born in Larvik, Norway, the sixth child of lawyer Victor Emanuel Tambs and his wife Henriette. As a child, he lost his father and a brother drowned while sailing. Tambs was employed at the age of 15 on a square rig. After eight years long trip ( to Australia ), he tried his hand as a secretary, journalist, writer and importer in Oslo. Because really succeeded in anything, he summed up the plan in 1928, along with his wife Julie on her own keel, Teddy sail it. They had secret - the authorities would not let them run out due to lack of equipment of their ships - sneak out of the harbor. Less than a year after the start was the Canaries born son Tony, six weeks later they began to cross the Atlantic. About Trinidad and Panama reached the South Seas . Cocos Islands, Marquesas and Society Islands was on his way in 1931, New Zealand Tui daughter is born. 1932, after the expiration of Auckland drove Teddy in the cutting of Challenger Islands on the rocks . Tambs cut Tony, who was tied to the railing, going on and jumped with the child on a rocky promontory . Julie was washed overboard, fought the battered land . Tambs also saved Tui, surf shattered ship. [1 ]
As of 1935 Cruising Club of America an Atlantic Regatta printed, Tambs wanted to represent his homeland . He bought Sandefjord, one Colin Archer crack, and sailed with friends for Newport . In the storm a huge wave swept the boat, it capsized . A man drowned in accordance notriggers they reached the target.
1937 Erling Tambs again in the Pacific Ocean sailing. To fill up the travel fund, he had to charter the ship to birders, the island of Tristan da Cunha explored. Tambs into not once landed, sailed months in the county or expected hove to order. Sick from scurvy, and with a ship in a dilapidated condition reached Tambs Cape Town, where he had to sell the ship for lack of money. He died in 1967.
In Germany Erling Tambs published ' Books honeymoon, but how! In the pilot cuts the two seas, islands of the blessed and cruise fright. They are all about their travels. It is honestly written, engaging experience reports.

Ship 
The Sandefjord was a Norwegian Spitzgatter, a former working boat of the Coast Guard. It is a gaffelgetakelte ketch, the Colin Archer has resigned. It was in 1913 Risør built, and had a length oa of 14.36 m, a width of 4.94 m and a draft of 2.44 m, and she wore 82,6 m² sail, motor built Tambs from. 
On the pitch polling (over-head go) Sandefjord still takes textbooks reference when it comes to the characteristics of the fuselage and tail shapes of sailboats. Among sailors, Colin Archer cracks are not entirely uncontroversial: "Poor Am-wind properties," "too slow", "lack of buoyancy in the stern" arguments to one side, the other praises their "beauty", "the ability without danger in any weather accompanied "and the" good self-control abilities. "Colin Archer Double Ender is a type of yacht, which is already built more than 100 years virtually unchanged, probably unique in this Article 
The Sandefjord sailed in 1965 for 21 months in the world, and since then the Scandinavian coasts.

Works 
 Hard Cruising (Eng. "cruise of Horror" 1979) 
 The voyage With Teddy (Eng. "honeymoon - but how in the pilot cuts the two seas" 1947) 
 Islands of the Blessed (Leipzig 1944)
 The cruise of the Teddy (London 1933)

Norwegian writers
1888 births
1967 deaths
People from Larvik